José Báez may refer to:
Jose Baez (lawyer) (born 1968), American attorney
José Báez (baseball) (born 1953), former baseball player
José Luis Báez, Puerto Rican politician